Democrat Party is an epithet for the Democratic Party of the United States, used in a disparaging fashion by the party's opponents. While use of the term started out as non-hostile, it has grown in its negative use since the 1940s, in particular by members of the Republican Party—in party platforms,  partisan speeches, and press releases—as well as by conservative commentators and third party politicians.

Modern usage
The term Democrat Party is an epithet for the Democratic Party of the United States, used disparagingly by the party's opponents. United Press International reported in August 1984 that the term had been employed "in recent years by some right-wing Republicans" because the party name implied that the Democrats were "the only true adherents of democracy".

Language expert Roy Copperud said it was used by Republicans who disliked the implication that Democratic Party implied to listeners that Democrats "are somehow the anointed custodians of the concept of democracy". According to Oxford Dictionaries, the use of Democrat rather than the adjective Democratic "is in keeping with a longstanding tradition among Republicans of dropping the –ic in order to maintain a distinction from the broader, positive associations of the adjective democratic with democracy and egalitarianism".

Political commentator William Safire wrote in 1993 that the Democrat of Democrat Party "does conveniently rhyme with autocrat, plutocrat, and worst of all, bureaucrat". In 2006, Hendrik Hertzberg wrote in The New Yorker:

Republican pollster Frank Luntz tested the phrase with a focus group in 2001, and concluded that the only people who really disliked the epithet were highly partisan Democrats. Political analyst Charlie Cook attributed modern use of the term to force of habit rather than a deliberate epithet by Republicans. Journalist Ruth Marcus stated that Republicans likely only continue to employ the term because Democrats dislike it, and Hertzberg calls use of the term "a minor irritation" and also "the partisan equivalent of flashing a gang sign".

Grammar
Among authors of dictionaries and usage guides who state that the use of Democrat  as an adjective is ungrammatical are Roy H. Copperud, Bergen Evans, and William and Mary Morris. In particular, the latter have written: "It is the idiotic creation of some of the least responsible members of the Republican Party."

In 2005, Ruth Walker, who has been the long-time language columnist for The Christian Science Monitor, while stating that Democratic is the correct term in most instances, placed the adjectival use of Democrat within a broader trend: 

In 2012, the British magazine The Economist stated:

History

19th century
In American history, many parties were named by their opponents: (Federalists, Loco-Focos, Know Nothings, Populists, Dixiecrats), including the Democrats themselves, as the Federalists in the 1790s used Democratic Party as a term of ridicule.

Addressing a gathering of Michigan Republicans in 1889, New Hampshire Republican Congressman Jacob H. Gallinger said:

According to the Oxford English Dictionary, the term was used by the press in London, England, as a synonym for the more common Democratic Party in 1890:Whether a little farmer from South Carolina named Tillman is going to rule the Democrat Party in America—yet it is this, and not output, on which the proximate value of silver depends.

Early 20th century

The 1919 New Teachers' and Pupils' Cyclopaedia entry for Woodrow Wilson states that "In 1912, Wilson was the Democrat Party nominee for President ..." On July 14, 1922, a newspaper in Keytesville, Missouri, posted an advertisement for its primary elections with the Democratic candidates identified as "Representing: Democrat Party".

Late 20th century

The noun-as-adjective has been used by Republican leaders since the 1940s, and in most GOP national platforms since 1948 and began being popularized by Brazilla Carroll Reece in 1946. By the early 1950s, the term was in widespread use among Republicans of all factions. When Senator Thruston Ballard Morton became chairman of the Republican National Committee in 1959, he indicated that he had always said Democratic Party and would continue to do so, which contrasted with his predecessor, Meade Alcorn, and with National Republican Senatorial Committee chairman Barry Goldwater, both of whom used Democrat Party. According to Congressional Quarterly, at the 1968 Republican National Convention "the GOP did revert to the epithet of 'Democrat' party. The phrase had been used in 1952 and 1956 but not in 1960 and 1964".

According to William Safire, Minnesota Governor Harold Stassen, campaign manager to Republican Wendell Willkie during the 1940 presidential campaign, explained that because the Democratic Party was at that time partly controlled by undemocratic city bosses, "by Hague in New Jersey, Pendergast in Missouri and Kelly-Nash in Chicago, [it] should not be called a 'Democratic Party.' It should be called the 'Democrat Party.'"

Columnist Russell Baker wrote in 1976: 

During the 1984 Republican National Convention, use of the term was a point of contention among the delegates. When a member of the Republican platform committee asked unanimous consent to change the phrasing of a platform amendment to read Democrat Party instead of Democratic Party, New York Representative Jack Kemp objected, saying that would be "an insult to our Democratic friends;" the committee dropped the proposal.

Newt Gingrich, in his efforts in the 1980s and 1990s to produce a Republican majority in the United States House of Representatives, relied heavily on words and phrases that cast Democrats in a negative light. The phrase Democrat Party gained new currency when the Republican Party, led by Gingrich, gained control of the House of Representatives in 1994.

In 1996, the wording throughout the Republican Party platform was changed from Democratic Party to Democrat Party: Republican leaders "explained they wanted to make the subtle point that the Democratic Party had become elitist". A proposal to use the term in the August 2008 Republican platform for similar reasons was voted down, with leaders choosing to use Democratic Party. "We probably should use what the actual name is," said Mississippi Governor Haley Barbour, the panel's chairman. "At least in writing."

21st century 
Following his inauguration in 2001, President George W. Bush often used the noun-as-adjective when referring to the Democratic Party. Ruth Marcus, an opinion writer and columnist for The Washington Post, wrote in 2006, "The derisive use of 'Democrat' in this way was a Bush staple during the recent campaign".

Bush spoke of the "" in his 2007 State of the Union Address, although the advance copy that was given to members of Congress read "Democratic majority". Democrats complained about the use of Democrat as an adjective in the address; John Podesta, White House Chief of Staff under Bush's predecessor Bill Clinton, said it was "like nails on a chalkboard", although congressional historian Julian E. Zelizer has opined that "It's hard to disentangle whether that's an intentional slight". Political analyst Charlie Cook doubted it was a deliberate attempt to offend Democrats, saying Republicans "have been [using the term] so long that they probably don't even realize they're doing it".

Bush joked about the issue in a February 4, 2007 speech to House Democrats, stating "Now look, my diction isn't all that good. I have been accused of occasionally mangling the English language. And so I appreciate you inviting the head of the Republic Party."

Donald Trump has used the phrase repeatedly, both during his presidential campaign and as president. In a July 2018 campaign rally, he said that "The Democratic Party sounds too good so I don't want to use that, OK?" He added, "I call it the Democrat Party. It sounds better rhetorically." At a September 2018 rally he suggested that "When you see 'Democratic Party,' it's wrong. There's no name, 'Democratic Party.'" At the Conservative Political Action Conference in 2019, he stated he liked to say, "the 'Democrat Party,' because it doesn't sound good. But that's all the more reason I use it, because it doesn't." During the first White House Coronavirus Task Force press conference, he advanced this usage with, "... governors including Democratic—or Democrat, as I call them—governors—which is actually the correct term."

During the 2020 United States presidential election, a conservative advocacy group created the website "Democrat Voters Against Joe Biden", in an apparent attempt to respond to Republican Voters Against Trump. According to The Daily Beast, the former found only one registered Democrat for its testimonies by September 2020; The Daily Beast opined that the name of the organization is a clue that its founders were unfamiliar with how registered Democrats refer to themselves. Deliberate usage of the term as an epithet accelerated in the late 2010s and 2020s.

Media organizations
According to Media Matters for America, the "ungrammatical" and "partisan" use of the phrase Democrat Party has "echoed Republicans" with its use in the Associated Press, CNN, The New York Times, The Wall Street Journal, and the Chicago Tribune.

NPR directed its staff in 2010 to use the adjective Democratic rather than Democrat. According to Ron Elving, NPR's senior Washington editor, it was the organization's policy to call parties by the name that they use to refer to themselves, saying: "We should not refer to Democrat ideas or Democrat votes. Any deviation from that by NPR reporters on air or online should be corrected".

Responses
In the mid-1950s, members of the Democratic National Committee proposed using "Publican Party" instead of "Republican Party". The committee failed to accept the proposal, "explaining that Republican is the name by which our opponents' product is known and mistrusted". Sherman Yellen suggested "The Republicants" as suitably comparable in terms of negative connotation in an April 29, 2007, Huffington Post column.

On the February 26, 2009 edition of Hardball with Chris Matthews, California Republican Representative Darrell Issa referred to "a Democrat Congress". The host, Chris Matthews, responded by saying:

Issa denied that he intended to use "fighting words", to which Matthews replied, "They call themselves the Democratic Party. Let's just call people what they call themselves and stop the Mickey Mouse here—save that for the stump."

In March 2009, after Representative Jeb Hensarling (R–Texas) repeatedly used the phrase Democrat Party when questioning U.S. Office of Management and Budget director Peter Orszag, Representative Marcy Kaptur (D–Ohio) said:

Notes

References

Further reading

 
 
 
 
 
 
 
 

Democratic Party (United States)
Political terminology of the United States
Epithets
Republican Party (United States) terminology